Incursion is a 1992 roleplaying game.

Incursion may also refer to:

Incursion (comics), a Marvel Comics concept from the 2015–16 storyline "Secret Wars"
Incursion (Marvel Cinematic Universe), a Marvel Cinematic Universe concept
"Incursion (Part 1)" and "Incursion (Part 2)", Stargate Universe episodes
Runway incursion, an aviation incident

See also 
 Excursion (disambiguation)
 Invasion
 Attack (disambiguation)